Heavenly Daze is a 1948 short subject directed by Jules White starring American slapstick comedy team The Three Stooges (Moe Howard, Larry Fine, and Shemp Howard). It is the 109th entry in the series released by Columbia Pictures starring the comedians, who released 190 shorts for the studio between 1934 and 1959.

Plot
Shemp has died and is in Heaven, talking with his Uncle Mortimer (Moe, dressed to resemble Moses, real name Moses Horowitz).  Mortimer is on the phone checking to see if Shemp will remain in Heaven or Hell, and it does not look good. Furthermore, it comes to light that cousins Moe and Larry have also not been on their best behavior. Seeing this as an opportunity for his deceased nephew, Uncle Mortimer gives Shemp the chance to reform Moe and Larry from their evil ways so he can gain entry to Heaven. The catch is that Shemp cannot be seen nor heard by anyone on Earth, much to his delight.

Back on Earth, Moe and Larry are crying their eyes out while attending the reading of Shemp's will with their attorney, I. Fleecem (Vernon Dent). Seems that Shemp has left behind a grand total of $140, which is $10 less than Fleecem's fee of $150 (a rip-off as Fleecem himself admits any other lawyer would take the case for $20). The boys grumble about not having much dough, but invisible Shemp swipes the money back from Fleecem, putting it in Moe and Larry's pockets. When they realize money has magically reappeared, they get spooked, and then remember Shemp saying he would come back to haunt them. They brush this off, but do not completely clear their heads of Shemp's ghostly presence.

Afterwards, Moe and Larry rent a luxury apartment, complete with butler Spiffingham (Sam McDaniel), and rent tuxedos. The boys have a grand scheme that involves the conning of wealthy couple the DePuysters (Victor Travers and Symona Boniface) into buying a fountain pen that will write under whipped cream.

Shemp enters the luxurious apartment and terrorises Spiffingham the Butler into leaving. He then smacks Moe and Larry to let them know he is there. Though their butler has run off, Moe and Larry remain, but frightened. The DePuysters show up, and promptly receive dollops of cream in their face when Shemp turns the mixer to "high." After the mixer catches fire, Shemp begins yelling. A few moments later, he awakes, realizing this was all a dream, but then, to his horror, he discovers that the bed is on fire from a cigarette he was smoking. After putting out the fire, Shemp tells his cousins his dream of how they invented a fountain pen that writes under whipped cream; Moe hits him with a cream pie and gives him a pen and Larry gives him a notepaper and  tells Shemp to write himself a letter ("Dear Ma...").

Cast

Credited
 Moe Howard as Moe and Uncle Mortimer
 Larry Fine as Larry
 Shemp Howard as Shemp
 Vernon Dent as I. Fleecem
 Sam McDaniel as Spiffingham

Uncredited
 Marti Shelton as Miss Jones
 Judy Malcolm as Heavenly switchboard operator
 Victor Travers as Mr. DePeyster (final film)
 Symona Boniface as Mrs. DePeyster
 Jules White as Heavenly Train announcer (voice)
 Brian O'Hara as Gunslinger

Production notes
Heavenly Daze was filmed on June 23–26, 1947; it was remade in 1955 as Bedlam In Paradise, using ample stock footage. The title is a play on "heavenly days," a popular catch-phrase from radio program Fibber McGee and Molly.

In the 1940s, the supernatural was a popular fantasy film genre of the departed coming back to assist the living such as Here Comes Mr Jordan, A Matter of Life and Death, Wonder Man, It’s A Wonderful Life, and Columbia's Mr. Jordan sequel Down to Earth. The Tom and Jerry series also reworked parts of Heavenly Daze the following year in Heavenly Puss.

Larry asks why anyone would want a fountain pen that would write under whipped cream. Moe responds that people might be in a desert where they would not be able to write under water. This refers to the first ball point pen being introduced by Milton Reynolds in 1945 that was a bestseller. It was sold for $10 with the slogan "It writes under water."

Among the stops the train to Earth makes is Cucamonga. This is a reference to the famous running gag on The Jack Benny Program in which a train stops at "Anaheim, Azusa and Cuc.....amonga."

A gag in the film's script called for a fountain pen to be thrown into the middle of Larry's forehead. The pen was to be thrown on a wire and into a small hole in a tin plate fastened to Larry's head. However, due to a miscalculation on the part of the special effects department, the sharp pen point punctured Larry's skin, leaving a gash in his forehead. In a fit of rage, Moe chased director Jules White around the set because White had promised that the gag would be harmless.

References

External links 
 
 

1948 films
1948 comedy films
The Three Stooges films
American black-and-white films
Films about dreams
Films directed by Jules White
Columbia Pictures short films
American comedy short films
1940s English-language films
1940s American films